Democracy, Joan Didion's fourth novel, was published in 1984. Set in Hawaii and Southeast Asia at the end of the Vietnam War, the book tells the story of Inez Victor, wife of U.S. Senator and one-time presidential hopeful Harry Victor, and her enduring romance with Jack Lovett, a CIA agent/war profiteer whom Inez first met as a teenager living in Hawaii. 

Democracy is unusual in that its narrator is not a character within the novel's world but a voice whom Didion identifies as herself, a writer self-consciously struggling with the ambiguities of her ostensible material, the ironies attendant to narration, and the inevitable contradictions at the heart of any story-telling. Didion's deft and economical use of this conceit allows her to comment not only upon the novel she chose to write, a romantic tragedy, but also upon the novel she chose not to write, a family epic encompassing generations of Inez's wealthy Hawaiian family, artless emblems of the colonial impulse.

At the time Democracy was published, the work was widely recognized as Didion's best novel to date for the skillful way she combined reportorial skill with literary style. However, some critics felt the book's realism undercut its overall achievement as a novel.

References

External Links 

 Book page on official website

1984 American novels
Novels by Joan Didion
Metafictional novels
Novels set in Hawaii